Tim Blue (born July 10, 1984) is an American professional basketball player. He is mostly known for his stint with the Antibes Sharks of the French LNB Pro A. Blue usually played as power forward or small forward. In his professional career, he has played in the Netherlands, Germany, Finland and France.

College 
Blue played at Palm Beach Gardens High School before enrolling at Indian River State College in 2003. He spent the 2003-04 campaign with The River, before heading to Middle Tennessee State University, where he played from 2005 to 2007. In his two years with the Blue Raiders, he averaged 9.0 points and 4.9 rebounds a contest.

Professional career
Blue won the Dutch basketball championship with the GasTerra Flames Groningen in 2010. In August 2010, he was signed by German Basketball Bundesliga side Mitteldeutscher BC. After returning to the Netherlands and a brief stint in Finland, Blue moved to France.

Antibes Sharks (2012–2020)
In the 2013–14 season, Blue played in the French Pro A with Antibes. Antibes team finished 16th and relegated back to the second division Pro B.

In the 2014–15 season, Blue finished 6th in the regular season with Antibes Sharks. In the Playoffs, Antibes won the Finals 2–0 over ASC Denain-Voltaire PH. After averaging 20 points per game in the Finals, Blue won his second LNB Pro B Finals MVP Award. In his eight years with the club, Blue scored a total of 3990 points and grabbed 1699 rebounds in league play. He had his jersey number retired at Antibes in March 2021.

Following eight years with the Antibes Sharks, he joined lower-league team Azuréa Golfe-Juan, just outside of Antibes.

Honours

With club
GasTerra Flames
Dutch Basketball League champion (1): 2009–10
Antibes Sharks
LNB Pro B champion (1): 2012–13

Individual
French 2nd Division Finals MVP (2): 2013, 2015
DBL All-Star (3): 2008, 2010, 2011
LNB Pro A All-Star (2): 2016, 2017

References

External links

Profile at eurobasket.com
Profile at real-gm.com
Profile at draftexpress.com
Finnish league bio at basket.fi

1984 births
Living people
American expatriate basketball people in Finland
American expatriate basketball people in France
American expatriate basketball people in Germany
American expatriate basketball people in the Netherlands
Basketball players from Florida
Donar (basketball club) players
Dutch Basketball League players
Indian River State Pioneers men's basketball players
KTP-Basket players
Middle Tennessee Blue Raiders men's basketball players
Mitteldeutscher BC players
Olympique Antibes basketball players
People from Palm Beach Gardens, Florida
Power forwards (basketball)
Small forwards
Sportspeople from the Miami metropolitan area
West-Brabant Giants players
American men's basketball players